The Big Four (or Big 4) is the colloquial name given to the four main banks in several countries where the banking industry is dominated by just four institutions and where the phrase has thus gained relevance. Some countries include more or fewer institutions in such rankings, leading to other names such as Big Three, Big Five, or Big Six.

International use 
Internationally, the term "Big Four Banks" has traditionally referred to the following central banks:
  The Bank of England
  The Federal Reserve
  The Bank of Japan
  The European Central Bank

Australia 

In Australia, the "big four banks" refers to the four largest banks who have traditionally dominated Australia's banking industry in terms of market share, revenue and total assets. The "big four banks" of Australia are:

 Australia and New Zealand Banking Group
 Commonwealth Bank (owned by the Australian Government until 1996)
 National Australia Bank
 Westpac

A longstanding policy of the Federal Government in Australia has been to maintain this status quo, called the four pillars policy. The policy has been maintained through the Global Recession of 2008–09, as Westpac acquired St George Bank and the Commonwealth Bank acquired Bankwest, reinforcing the special status of the "big four".

Austria 
The "Big Four" banks of Austria are:
 Erste Bank / Sparkasse* (credit unions)
 UniCredit Bank Austria (formerly Bank Austria Creditanstalt)
 Raiffeisen Bankengruppe*
 BAWAG P.S.K. (formerly Österreichische Postsparkasse)
*separate legal entities operating under a common brand

Belgium 
The big four banks of Belgium are a result of national and international mergers in the early 90s.
 KBC Bank, including its CBC Banque subsidiary in the French Community of Belgium and KBC Brussels brand in the Brussels-Capital Region
 Belfius, government owned bank
 BNP Paribas Fortis, subsidiary of BNP Paribas
 ING Bank, subsidiary of the ING Group

Brazil 
In Brazil, the "big four", according to Exame Magazine in 2017:

Cambodia 
According to the National Bank of Cambodia, the top three largest bank in Cambodia dominates 39.1% (The largest bank in term of total asset is Canadia Bank at 14.2%, followed by ACLEDA Bank at 12.7%, in third place Advanced Bank of Asia (ABA) at 12.2%) of the overall banking assets as of 2020. These banks are:

 Canadia Bank
 ACLEDA Bank
 Advanced Bank of Asia

Canada 

There are five banks dominating the Canadian banking sector, hence the "Big Five" is used instead of "Big Four".

 Royal Bank of Canada (RBC)
 Toronto-Dominion Bank (TD)
 Bank of Nova Scotia (Scotiabank)
 Bank of Montreal (BMO)
 Canadian Imperial Bank of Commerce (CIBC)

China 

During the 1920s, the term "big four" applied to the Four Northern Banks of the Republic of China (i.e., the four most capitalized commercial banks in Northern China). These were the Yien Yieh Commercial Bank, the Kincheng Banking Corporation, the Continental Bank and The China & South Sea Bank. They were contrasted with the Three Southern Banks of Southern China.

By 1949, the "big four" banks were the Bank of China, the Bank of Communications, the Central Bank of China and the Farmers Bank of China. All four were state-owned. Together with Central Trust of China, Postal Savings and Remittance Bureau of China, and Central Cooperative Treasury of China, these banks were called the "four banks, two bureaus, one treasury" or "四行两局一库".

In the People's Republic of China, the Big Five Banks ("五大银行") are:
 Industrial and Commercial Bank of China
 Bank of China
 China Construction Bank
 Agricultural Bank of China
 Bank of Communications

All five are state-controlled banks with commercial banking operations. Since Bank of Communications was refounded in 1986, it was sometimes excluded, leaving the rest as "Big Four".

Colombia 
In Colombia, the ten biggest banking service networks are:

Czech Republic 
In Czech Republic, according to R. Pazderník, the "big four" are:
Česká spořitelna, subsidiary of Erste Group
Československá obchodní banka, subsidiary of KBC Bank
Komerční banka, subsidiary of Société Générale (formerly State Bank of Czechoslovakia)
Investiční a poštovní banka.

Estonia 

 LHV
 Luminor
 SEB
 Swedbank Estonia

Finland 

 Danske Bank
 Nordea
 OP
 Säästöpankkiryhmä

France 
In France, according to The Banker, the  six major banking groups are:
 BNP Paribas
 Crédit Agricole
 Société Générale
 Groupe BPCE
 Crédit Mutuel
 La Banque Postale

Germany 
 Deutsche Bank
 DZ Bank
 KfW
 Commerzbank

Hong Kong 
In Hong Kong, some media refer to the following as "big four":

 The Hongkong and Shanghai Banking Corporation (HSBC Hong Kong)
 Hang Seng Bank (Principal member of the HSBC Group)
 Bank of China (Hong Kong)
 Standard Chartered Bank (Hong Kong)

HSBC, Standard Chartered Bank (Hong Kong) and Bank of China (Hong Kong) are the three note-issuing banks; Hang Seng and HSBC Hong Kong are both under the common ownership of London-based HSBC Holdings plc. According to Global Retail Banking Cross-sell conducted by RFi group in 2015, HSBC, Bank of China (Hong Kong) and Hang Seng Bank were the top 3 most popular banks in Hong Kong.

India 

In India the four largest banks, based on total assets, are:
State Bank of India
HDFC Bank
ICICI Bank
Kotak Mahindra Bank

Indonesia 
In Indonesia, the term "big four" is not explicitly used. As of 2018, the four largest banks by total assets are:
Bank Rakyat Indonesia (BRI)
Bank Mandiri
Bank Central Asia (BCA)
Bank Negara Indonesia (BNI)

BRI, Bank Mandiri and BNI are all controlled by the central government as state-owned enterprises.

Ireland 
In Ireland, the term "big four" applies to the four largest banks by market capitalisation.
 Bank of Ireland
 Allied Irish Banks
 Permanent TSB
 Ulster Bank (a wholly-owned subsidiary of NatWest Bank) – withdrawing from the Republic of Ireland.

Israel 
 Bank Hapoalim
 Bank Leumi
 Discount Bank
 Bank Mizrahi-Tefahot

Japan 
In Japan, the term "big three" is used instead of "big four". The "big three" are:
 Mitsubishi UFJ Financial Group
 SMBC Group
 Mizuho Financial Group

Japan had a "big four" between 2002 and 2005, when the Bank of Tokyo-Mitsubishi and UFJ Japan were still separate entities.  The two merged to form Mitsubishi UFJ, now the largest of the three, in 2005.

These banks are all listed in the Tokyo Stock Exchange (where they are constituents of the Nikkei 225 and TOPIX Core30 indices) and the New York Stock Exchange in the form of American depositary receipts; MUFG and SMBC Group are both additionally listed in the Nagoya Stock Exchange and serve as the financial arms of their respective namesake keiretsu (Mitsubishi for MUFG, Sumitomo and Mitsui for SMBC).

Kenya 

 KCB Bank Kenya Limited
 Equity Bank
 Co-operative Bank
 NCBA Group

Lebanon 
In Lebanon, where the banks have retained their banking secrecy laws since 1956, which is prevalent in the whole MENA region, and while adopting international measures to fight money laundering, the "big four" banks consist of:
 Bank Audi (founded in 1830 and ranked on the Forbes Magazine Global 2000 list of largest public companies in the world in 2016)
 Byblos Bank (founded in 1950 as "Société Commerciale et Agricole Byblos Bassil Frères & Co.")
 BLOM Bank: Banque du Liban et d'Outre-Mer S.A.L (founded in 1951)
 Fransabank (founded in 1921 as Société Centrale de Banque)
Furthermore, as of September 2016, there are more than 51 banks in Lebanon, one of the smallest countries in the Middle East, the fact that has always made investors from the Arab countries, especially the GCC petrodollar in addition to the European and world investors, to place their funds in the Lebanese banks.

Luxembourg 
The "big four" full-service banks in Luxembourg are:
 Banque et Caisse d'Épargne de l'État (Spuerkeess), state owned bank
 Banque Internationale à Luxembourg,
 BGL BNP Paribas
 ING Luxembourg
There are bigger banks in Luxembourg, but these only deliver a limited number of services such as investment banking, private banking or corporate banking only. Luxembourg is a financial center.

Malaysia 
According to Central Bank of Malaysia, the top four banks by assets size are:

 Maybank
 CIMB
 Public Bank
 RHB Bank

Mexico 
The "big four" in Mexico are:
 BBVA Bancomer
 Citibanamex
 Banco Santander
 Banorte

Myanmar 
According to Asia Times, the four largest bank in Myanmar are:

 Kanbawza Bank
 Ayeyarwady Bank
 CB Bank
 Yoma Bank

Netherlands 
The "big four" banks in the Netherlands by market concentration are:
 ING Group
 Rabobank
 ABN AMRO
 de Volksbank, state owned banking arm of SNS Reaal

The market leader for the Netherlands, ING Group, is one of the largest multinational banking and financial service corporations in the world, with products and services reaching over 41 countries worldwide.

New Zealand 
New Zealand is Australia's closest neighbour, with very close cultural and economic ties. The big four Australian banks (often referred to collectively as the 'big banks' or the 'big Aussie banks') also dominate the banking sector in New Zealand, through subsidiaries:

 ANZ Bank New Zealand (ANZ), a subsidiary of Australia and New Zealand Banking Group
 ASB Bank (ASB), formerly Auckland Savings Bank, a subsidiary of Commonwealth Bank of Australia
 Bank of New Zealand (BNZ), a subsidiary of the National Australia Bank
 Westpac New Zealand (WBC), formerly WestpacTrust after a merger with Trust Bank, a subsidiary of Westpac Banking Corporation

Together they hold over 90% of gross loans and advances in New Zealand as well as close to 90% of all mortgages.

These four NZ subsidiaries are massively profitable and in some cases even outperform the Australian parent companies. The extent to which they dominate the banking sector can be seen in profits: In the 2012/2013 financial year, the largest of the Big Banks, ANZ New Zealand, made a profit of NZ$1.37 billion. The smallest, BNZ, made a profit of NZ$695 million. State-owned Kiwibank, community trust-owned TSB Bank, SBS Bank (formerly Southland Building Society) and Heartland Bank, the next four largest banks by profit, made NZ$97 million, NZ$73.5 million, NZ$14 million and NZ$7 million (albeit with an underlying result of about NZ$30 million) respectively. Thus, the profit of New Zealand's next four largest banks (after the Big Four) is equal to less than 30% of the smallest of the Big Four, BNZ.

Nigeria 
The term "Big Five" is used instead of four, with five banks dominating the Nigerian banking world. In 2011, these top five banks had a combined balance sheet, including contingents, of 12.9 trillion naira ($821 billion), 33 percent higher than the prior year.

 Zenith Bank
 First Bank of Nigeria
 Guaranty Trust Bank
 Access Bank
 United Bank for Africa (UBA)

North Macedonia 
According to PricewaterhouseCoopers, three largest banks in North Macedonia dominates 60% of the banking market share.

 Komercijalna banka Skopje
 Stopanska Banka
 NLB Tutunska

Pakistan 
The "top five" banks of Pakistan are:
HBL
Meezan Bank Limited
MCB Bank Limited
National Bank of Pakistan
United Bank
Allied Bank

Panama 
 Banco General
 Banistmo
 Banco Nacional
 BAC Credomatic

Peru 
In Peru the "big four" are:
 Banco de Crédito del Perú
 BBVA Perú
 Scotiabank (subsidiary of the Canadian bank)
 Interbank

Philippines 
The term "Big Four" is not explicitly used in the Philippines. The following are the four largest banks in the country in terms of total assets as of March 2020:
Banco de Oro
Metrobank
Land Bank of the Philippines
Bank of the Philippine Islands

Romania 
The Romanian banking system has almost 40 banks, most of them detained by local financial vehicles, and some of them subsidiaries of foreign banks. The big four are as follows.
 Banca Comercială Română, now part of the Erste Group
 Banca Transilvania, the biggest bank detained by private investors with domestic capital
 BRD – Groupe Société Générale, formerly known as Romanian Bank for Development
 CEC Bank, the state-owned bank, formerly known as Casa de Economii și Consemnațiuni
Other major banks are Raiffeisen Bank, Unicredit Bank and a subsidiary of the ING Bank of Holland.

Russia 
Four largest banks by operations and assets in Russia by December 2020:

 Sberbank
 VTB Bank
 Gazprombank
 Alfa-Bank

Singapore 
In Singapore, the "Big Three" are:
 DBS Bank
 POSB Bank
 OCBC Bank
 Bank of Singapore
 United Overseas Bank

South Africa 
In South Africa, the "big four" are:
 Absa Group Limited, majority owned by Barclays between 2005 and early 2018.
 FirstRand Bank, operators of First National Bank.
 Nedbank, minority-owned by Old Mutual.
 Standard Bank, spin off from Standard Chartered Bank in 1987.

South Korea 
In South Korea, the "Big Four" are:
 Woori Bank
 KB Kookmin Bank
 Shinhan Bank
 KEB Hana Bank

Spain 
As of September 2021, the "big four" in Spain are:
 Banco Santander
 BBVA
 Caixabank
 Banco Sabadell

There were formerly a "big six" (los seis grandes) composed of three banks that are now part of BBVA (Banco de Bilbao, Banco de Vizcaya, and state-owned Banco Argentaria) and three now combined as Santander (Banco Central, Banco Hispanoamericano, and Banco de Santander).

Sri Lanka 
In Sri Lanka, the leading banks are, as of 2020

State owned banks,
 Bank of Ceylon
National Savings Bank
 People's Bank

Privately owned banks,

Commercial Bank of Ceylon PLC
Sampath Bank PLC
 Hatton National Bank PLC
National Development Bank PLC

Foreign owned leading banks,

 HSBC Sri Lanka
 Standard Chartered Bank Sri Lanka
 State Bank of India, Sri Lanka

Sweden 
In Sweden the "big four" are:

 Svenska Handelsbanken
 Skandinaviska Enskilda Banken
 Swedbank
 Nordea

Switzerland 
In Switzerland, the "big three" hold 45% of all customer deposits. They are:
 UBS
 Credit Suisse
 Raiffeisen (Switzerland)

Taiwan 
In Taiwan, the five "systemic banks" are:
 CTBC Bank
 Cathay United Bank
 Taipei Fubon Bank
 Mega International Commercial Bank
 Taiwan Cooperative Bank

Thailand 
In 2014, the "big four" together held over 66% of gross loans and controlled more than 67% of total assets in the banking system.
 Bangkok Bank
 Siam Commercial Bank
 Krung Thai Bank
 Kasikornbank

Prior to the Siamese Revolution, the banking system was controlled by foreign powers, particularly the "big four" European banks.
 The Hongkong and Shanghai Bank in 1888 (Now HSBC)
 The Chartered Bank of India, Australia and China in 1894 (Now Standard Chartered Bank Thailand)
 Banque de l'Indochine in 1897 (Now Banque Calyon, a subsidiary of Crédit Agricole)
 Mercantile Bank of India in 1923 (Now Citibank Thailand, a subsidiary of Citigroup)

Turkey 
In 2021, the top three largest state-owned bank together held over 37.1% of market share, while the top four largest foreign-owned banks in Turkey dominates 22.9% of the overall market share.

State-owned bank 
 Ziraat Bank
 Halkbank
 VakıfBank

Privately-owned bank 
 Garanti BBVA
 Akbank
 Yapı Kredi
 Türkiye İş Bankası

United Arab Emirates 
Based on total assets of listed banks at the end of 2017, big five banks in United Arab Emirates are:

 First Abu Dhabi Bank
 Emirates NBD
 Abu Dhabi Commercial Bank
 Dubai Islamic Bank
 Mashreq

United Kingdom

England and Wales 
In relation to England and Wales, the phrase "big four banks" is currently used to refer to the four largest banking groups:

HSBC;
Barclays;
Lloyds Banking Group; and
NatWest Group.

Scotland 
In relation to Scotland, the phrase “big four” is currently used to refer to the four largest banking groups:

 Royal Bank of Scotland (NatWest Group);
 Bank of Scotland (Lloyds Banking Group);
 Clydesdale Bank (Virgin Money UK); and
 TSB Bank (Banco Sabadell).

Northern Ireland 
In relation to Northern Ireland, the phrase “big four” is currently used to refer to the four largest banking groups:

Bank of Ireland;
Ulster Bank (NatWest Group);
Northern Bank trading as Danske Bank; and
Allied Irish Banks.

Historical use 

Until 1970, the phrase "big five" (as opposed to “little six”) was used to refer to the five largest UK clearing banks (institutions which clear bankers' cheques), which in England and Wales were:
 Barclays Bank;
 Midland Bank (now HSBC Bank and part of HSBC);
 Lloyds Bank (now part of Lloyds Banking Group);
 National Provincial Bank; and
 Westminster Bank.

After the merger of Westminster Bank, National Provincial Bank and District Bank to form National Westminster Bank (now part of NatWest Group) in 1970, the term "big four" came into use instead.

United States 
In the United States, the "big four" banks hold 45% of all U.S. customer deposits (as of 2018), and each have assets of more than 1.5 trillion U.S. Dollars. The banks are, in order of size:

JPMorgan Chase (headquartered in New York City, bank chartered in Columbus, Ohio)
Bank of America (headquartered and bank chartered in Charlotte, North Carolina)
Citigroup (headquartered in New York City, bank chartered in Sioux Falls, South Dakota)
Wells Fargo (headquartered in San Francisco, California, bank chartered in Wilmington, Delaware)

Regardless of the jurisdiction of charter, the legal entity of these banks are all subsidiaries of Delaware-chartered bank holding companies.

From a retail banking perspective, U.S. Bank and PNC Bank both have significantly more branches than Citibank, the retail banking arm of Citigroup. However, Citigroup still has significantly more assets than U.S. Bancorp and PNC Financial Services.

Vietnam 
In Vietnam, the four major banking groups are:

 Vietcombank
 Agribank
 BIDV
 Vietinbank

References 

Banks
Lists of banks